Tall Maran (also Romanized as Tall Mārān and Tol Mārān) is a village in Milas Rural District, in the Central District of Lordegan County, Chaharmahal and Bakhtiari Province, Iran. At the 2006 census, its population was 706, in 151 families.

References 

Populated places in Lordegan County